Scott Wayne Ecklund (born October 3, 1955)  is an American politician and a Republican member of the South Dakota House of Representatives representing District 25 since January 11, 2013.

Early life
Scott lives in Sioux Falls, South Dakota. He received his graduation from Augustana University and attended medical school at the University of South Dakota.

Elections
2012 When incumbent Republican Representative Stace Nelson was redistricted to District 19 and left a District 25 seat open, Ecklund ran in the June 5, 2012 Republican Primary; in the four-way November 6, 2012 General election, incumbent Republican Representative Jon Hansen took the first seat and Ecklund took the second seat with 5,718 votes (30.90%) ahead of Democratic nominees Bill Laird and Janelle Smedsrud, who had replaced former Democratic Representative Oran Sorenson on the ballot after the primary.

References

External links
Official page at the South Dakota Legislature
 

Place of birth missing (living people)
Living people
Republican Party members of the South Dakota House of Representatives
People from Brandon, South Dakota
Physicians from South Dakota
1955 births